Sturgeon River is a river in the Hudson Bay drainage basin in the central part of the Canadian province of Saskatchewan. It flows from its source in the Waskesiu Hills in Prince Albert National Park to the North Saskatchewan River, just west of the city of Prince Albert.

Course 
The Sturgeon River begins at a small lake named Antoine Lake in the Nimrod Hills range of the Waskesiu Hills in Prince Albert National Park. From the lake, the river heads west through muskeg, boreal forests, and glacier carved valleys to the western boundary of Prince Albert National Park, at which point it turns south following a glacial spillway that was formed at the end of the ice age. Sturgeon River continues south through the spillway forming the western boundary of the park and the eastern boundaries of the rural municipalities of Big River No. 555 and Canwood No. 494. The river carries on south through the RM of Shellbrook No. 493, Sturgeon Lake and Sturgeon Lake First Nation, and RM of Buckland No. 491 en route to the North Saskatchewan River. The river's mouth is west of Prince Albert at Peter Pond Point.

Tributaries 
The following are Sturgeon River's tributaries from the source in the Waskesiu Hills to the mouth at the North Saskatchewan River:
Lost Creek begins at Erickson Lake and flows south-west.
Crossman Creek begins at Crossman Lake and flows north-west.
Lofthouse Brook begins at a small lake in the Nimrod Hills just south of Antoine Lake and north of the source of Spruce River and flows west.
Fox Creek begins at Fox Lake and flows south-west to meet.
Rabbit Creek begins at Spruce and Leroy Lakes and flows south-west.
Flat Creek
Sugar Creek
Shell River, formally Shell Brook, begins at Shell Lake and flows east.
Mistowasis Creek
Tippicanoe Creek
Vant Creek
Sucker Creek

Sturgeon River Recreation Site 
Sturgeon River Recreation Site is a provincial recreation site located along the banks of the Sturgeon River near its mouth at the west end of Prince Albert. The site has a fully serviced campground and a picnic area. Access is from Highway 3.

See also 
List of rivers of Saskatchewan

References 

Rivers of Saskatchewan
North Saskatchewan River
Prince Albert National Park
Tributaries of Hudson Bay
Shellbrook No. 493, Saskatchewan
Canwood No. 494, Saskatchewan
Big River No. 555, Saskatchewan
Buckland No. 491, Saskatchewan
Division No. 15, Saskatchewan
Division No. 16, Saskatchewan